is a Japanese weightlifter. He competed in the men's middleweight event at the 1992 Summer Olympics.

References

1970 births
Living people
Japanese male weightlifters
Olympic weightlifters of Japan
Weightlifters at the 1992 Summer Olympics
Sportspeople from Tokyo
Weightlifters at the 1990 Asian Games
Weightlifters at the 1994 Asian Games
Asian Games silver medalists for Japan
Asian Games bronze medalists for Japan
Asian Games medalists in weightlifting
Medalists at the 1990 Asian Games
Medalists at the 1994 Asian Games
20th-century Japanese people
21st-century Japanese people